The Journal of Monetary Economics is a peer-reviewed academic journal covering research on macroeconomics and monetary economics. It is published by Elsevier and was established in October 1973 by Karl Brunner and Charles I. Plosser. Beginning in 2002, it was merged with the Carnegie-Rochester Conference Series on Public Policy. The latter series was established in 1976 and had been published independently, originally by the North-Holland Publishing Company, now an imprint of Elsevier.

According to the Journal Citation Reports, the journal has a 2021 impact factor of 4.63. Since 2022, its editors are Boragan Aruoba and Yuriy Gorodnichenko. It is widely regarded as one of the most prestigious academic journals in economics and was ranked as top 10 among all economics journals in 2008.

See also 
 List of economics journals

References

External links 
 

Economics journals
Publications established in 1973
Elsevier academic journals
English-language journals
8 times per year journals